The 1996 United States Senate election in Kentucky was held on November 5, 1996. Incumbent Republican U.S. Senator Mitch McConnell won re-election to a third term with a 12.6% margin of victory. McConnell's substantial victory occurred at the same time President Bill Clinton was re-elected to a second term, winning by an 8.5% margin nationwide, but carrying Kentucky by a 0.9% margin.

Beshear would later go on to run successfully for Governor of Kentucky in 2007.

Democratic primary

Candidates
 Tom Barlow, former U.S. Representative
 Steve Beshear, former Lieutenant Governor of Kentucky, former Attorney General of Kentucky and former State Representative
 Shelby Lanier, perennial candidate

Results

Republican primary

Candidates
 Mitch McConnell, incumbent U.S. Senator
 Tommy Klein, perennial candidate

Results

General election

Candidates
 Steve Beshear (Democratic), former Lieutenant Governor of Kentucky, former Attorney General of Kentucky and former Kentucky State Representative
 Mac Elroy (U.S. Tax Payers)
 Dennis Lacy (Libertarian)
 Mitch McConnell (Republican), incumbent U.S. Senator
 Patricia Jo Metten (Natural Law)

Campaign
In 1996, Beshear started out trailing against McConnell, with an early general election poll placing McConnell ahead of Beshear 50% to 32%. The campaign ultimately became quite harsh, with the McConnell campaign sending "Hunt Man," a take off of Chicken George dressed in "the red velvet coat, jodhpurs, black riding boots and black helmet of a patrician fox hunter." This was done as a means of criticizing Beshear's membership in a fox hunting club in Lexington, and undercut the Beshear campaign's message that McConnell was a Republican in the mold of Newt Gingrich and that Beshear was the only friend of the working class in the race. Beshear did not make much traction with the electorate during the campaign. By October 1996, Beshear had narrowed the gap between himself and McConnell slightly, with McConnell leading Beshear 50% to 38%.

Results

See also 
 1996 United States Senate elections

References 

1996 Kentucky elections
Kentucky
1996